Abdulrahman Mohammed Hussain (born 1 October 1972) is a Qatari football referee. He was a referee at the 2007 and 2011 AFC Asian Cup and also the AFC Champions League.

References

External links
 
 
 

1972 births
Qatari football referees
Living people
AFC Asian Cup referees